The 1974 NC State Wolfpack football team represented North Carolina State University during the 1974 NCAA Division I football season. The team's head coach was Lou Holtz. NC State has been a member of the Atlantic Coast Conference (ACC) since the league's inception in 1953. The Wolfpack played its home games in 1974 at Carter Stadium in Raleigh, North Carolina.

Schedule

Team players drafted into the NFL

Source:

References

NC State
NC State Wolfpack football seasons
NC State Wolfpack football